Xenarius was a Greek architect and urban planner during the 3rd century BC. He is known for his plan for the city of Antioch. The grid layout of the city is believed to be influenced by Dinocrates' plan of Alexandria.

References

Ancient Greek architects
Ancient Greek urban planners
Year of birth unknown
Year of death unknown
3rd-century BC Greek people